Steve Peacocke is an Australian actor.

Stephen Peacock(e) may also refer to:

Stephen Ponsonby Peacocke, landscape painter
Stephen Peacock (character), a character from the TV series Are You Being Served?